Some charitable organizations like the Scottish Rite Foundation have undertaken the task of testing for dyslexia and making training classes and materials available, often without cost, for teachers and students.

See also
 Learning Ally
 Greengate School
 Landmark College
 The Lewis School of Princeton
 Trident Academy

References

External links
 International Dyslexia Organization

United States
Education in the United States
Special education in the United States